The city of Seattle, Washington, is home to hundreds of parks of various classifications.

National parks
Seattle contains one area administered by the National Park Service.

City parks
Seattle's city parks are administered by Seattle Parks and Recreation, a city department. Several bike and pedestrian trails are maintained by the Seattle Department of Transportation or administered jointly by both departments. A number of waterfront parks are administered by the Port of Seattle, a municipal corporation.

Seattle's oldest park is Denny Park and its largest is Discovery Park. This list has only the notable parks.

Other non-profit parks 
A number of parks are operated by educational institutions or other non-profit organizations.

Private parks 
Private individuals and organizations maintain a number of parks which are open for use by the public.

Other

All Seattle parks
Parks administered by Seattle Parks and Recreation.

 12th Ave. Square Park
 12th West & West Howe Park
 14th Avenue NW Boat Ramp
 3001 E Madison Park
 32nd Ave W Boat Launch
 6th Avenue NW Pocket Park
 A. B. Ernst Park
 Adams Street Boat Ramp
 Albert Davis Park
 Alice Ball Park
 Alki Beach Park
 Alki Playground
 Alvin Larkins Park
 Amy Yee Tennis Center Park
 Andover Place
 Arroyos Natural Area
 Atlantic City Boat Ramp
 Atlantic Street Park
 B.F. Day Playground
 Bagley Viewpoint
 Baker Park on Crown Hill
 Ballard Commons Park
 Ballard Corners Park
 Ballard Playground
 Bar-S Playground
 Bayview Playground
 Bayview-Kinnear (Lower Kerry Park)
 Beacon Hill Playfield
 Beacon Place
 Beer Sheva Park
 Bell Street Park
 Bellevue Place
 Belltown Cottage Park
 Belmont Place
 Belvedere Park
 Belvoir Place
 Benefit Playground
 Benvenuto Viewpoint
 Bergen Place
 Bhy Kracke Park
 Bitter Lake Playfield
 Bitter Lake Reservoir Open Space
 Blaine Place
 Blue Dog Pond
 Blue Ridge Circle
 Blue Ridge Places
 Boren Park
 Boren Place
 Boylston Place
 Bradner Gardens Park
 Brighton Playfield
 Broadway Hill Park
 Bryant Neighborhood Playground
 Burke-Gilman Playground Park
 Burke-Gilman Trail
 Cal Anderson Park
 California Place
 Camp Long
 Carkeek Park
 Carleton Center
 Carleton Highlands
 Cascade Place
 Cascade Playground
 Cayton Corner Park
 Cedar Park
 Cesar Chavez Park
 Charles Richey Sr Viewpoint
 Cheasty Boulevard
 Cheasty Natural Area
 Cheshiahud Lake Union Loop
 Chinook Beach Park
 Christie Park
 City Hall Park
 Cleveland Playfield
 Coe Play Park
 College Street Park
 College Street Ravine
 Colman Park
 Colman Playground
 Columbia Park
 Commodore Park
 Corliss Place
 Cormorant Cove
 Cottage Grove Park
 Counterbalance Park
 Cowen Park
 Crescent Place
 Crown Hill Glen
 Crown Hill Park
 Daejeon Park
 Dahl Playfield
 Dakota Place Park
 David Rodgers Park
 Day Street Boat Ramp
 Dearborn Park
 Delridge and Myrtle Park
 Delridge Playfield
 Denny Blaine Lake Park
 Denny Park
 Denny Blaine Park
 Discovery Park
 Dr. Blanche Lavizzo Park
 Dr. Jose Rizal Park
 Don Armeni Boat Ramp
 Donnie Chin International Childrens Park
 Duwamish Waterway Park
 E.C. Hughes Playground
 East Duwamish Greenbelt
 East Montlake Park
 East Portal Viewpoint
 East Queen Anne Playground
 Eastmont Place
 Eddie Vine Boat Ramp
 Ella Bailey Park
 Emma Schmitz Memorial Overlook
 Endolyne Park
 Ercolini Park
 Fairmount Playground
 Fairview Park
 Fairview Walkway
 Fauntleroy Creek Ravine
 Fauntleroy Park
 Fauntleroy Place
 Ferdinand Street Boat Launch
 Firehouse Mini Park
 First Hill Park
 Fletcher Place
 Flo Ware Park
 Freeway Park
 Fremont Canal Park
 Fremont Peak Park
 Frink Park
 Fritz Hedges Waterway Park
 Froula Playground
 Garfield Playfield
 Gas Works Park
 Gemenskap Park
 Genesee Park and Playfield
 Georgetown Playfield
 Georgetown Pump Station
 Gerber Park
 Gilman Playground
 Golden Gardens Park
 Grand Army of the Republic Cemetery
 Green Lake Park
 Greenwood Park
 Greenwood Triangle
 Greg Davis Park
 Haller Lake Street End
 Hamilton Viewpoint Park
 Harrison Ridge Greenbelt
 Harvard-Miller/Roanoke Annex
 Herring's House Park
 Hiawatha Playfield
 Highland Drive Parkway
 Highland Park Playground
 Highland Place
 Hing Hay Park
 Hitt's Hill Park
 Homer Harris Park
 Horiuchi Park
 Horton Hill Corridor
 Howell Park
 Hubbard Homestead
 Hunter Boulevard
 Hutchinson Playground
 Hyde Place
 I-5 Colonnade
 Interbay Athletic Complex
 Interlaken Park
 Inverness Ravine Park
 Japanese Garden
 Jefferson Park
 Jimi Hendrix Park
 John C. Little, Sr. Park
 Judge Charles M. Stokes Overlook
 Judkins Park and Playfield
 Julia Lee’s Park
 Junction Plaza
 Katie Black's Garden
 Kerry Park
 Keystone Place
 Kilbourne Park
 Kinnear Park
 Kinnear Place
 Kirke Park
 Kiwanis Memorial Preserve Park
 Kobe Terrace
 Kubota Garden
 Lake City Memorial Triangle
 Lake City Mini Park
 Lake People Park
 Lake Union Park
 Lake Washington Boulevard
 Lakeridge Park
 Lakeridge Playfield
 Lakeview Park
 Lakeview Place
 Lakewood Playground
 Lakewood Triangle
 Lambert Place
 Landing Parkway
 Lawton Park
 Laurelhurst Playfield
 Leschi-Lake Dell Natural Area
 Leschi Park
 Licton Springs Park
 Lewis Park
 Lincoln Park
 Linden Orchard Park
 Little Brook Park
 Llandover Woods Greenspace
 Lowman Beach Park
 Longfellow Creek Natural Area
 Loyal Heights Playfield
 Lynn Street Mini Park
 MacLean Park
 Madison Park
 Madison Park North Beach
 Madrona Briar Patch
 Madrona Park
 Madrona Playground
 Madrona Ravine
 Magnolia Boulevard
 Magnolia Greenbelt
 Magnolia Manor Park
 Magnolia Park
 Magnolia Playfield
 Magnolia Tidelands Park
 Magnuson Park
 Maple Leaf Reservoir Park
 Maple School Ravine
 Maple Wood Playfield
 Marra-Desimone Park
 Marshall Park
 Martha Washington Park
 Martin Luther King Jr. Civil Rights Memorial Park
 Marvin's Garden
 Matthews Beach Park
 Mayfair Park
 McGilvra Boulevard
 McGilvra Place
 McGraw Square
 Meadowbrook Playfield
 Me-Kwa-Mooks Natural Area
 Me-Kwa-Mooks Park
 Meridian Playground
 Miller Playfield
 Miller Triangle
 Mineral Springs Park
 Mock Creek Ravine
 Montlake Boulevard
 Montlake Playfield
 Morgan Junction
 Mount Baker Boulevard
 Mount Baker Park
 Mount Claire Park
 Mt Baker Ridge Viewpoint
 Myrtle Edwards Park
 Myrtle Reservoir
 Nantes Park
 Nathan Hale Playfield
 NE 60th Street Park
 NE 130th Street End
 Nora's Woods
 North Beach Park
 North Passage Point
 Northacres Park
 Northeast Queen Anne Greenbelt
 Northgate Park
 Northlake Park
 Northwest 60th Viewpoint
 Observatory Courts
 Occidental Square
 Olympic Sculpture Park
 Open Water Park
 Orchard Street Ravine
 Othello Playground
 Oxbow Park
 Park Home Circle
 Parkmont Place
 Parsons Gardens Park
 Peace Park
 Pelly Place Natural Area
 Peppi's Playground
 Piers 62 and 63
 Pigeon Point Park 
 Pinehurst Playground
 Pinehurst Pocket Park
 Pioneer Square
 Pipers Creek Natural Area
 Plum Tree Park
 Plymouth Pillars Park
 Powell Barnett Park
 Pratt Park
 Prefontaine Place
 Prentis I. Frazier Park
 Pritchard Island Beach
 Puget Boulevard Commons
 Puget Creek Greenspace
 Puget Park
 Puget Ridge Playground
 Queen Anne Boulevard
 Queen Anne Bowl Playfield
 Rainbow Point
 Rainier Beach Playfield
 Rainier Beach Urban Farm and Wetlands
 Rainier Place
 Rainier Playfield
 Ravenna Boulevard
 Ravenna Park
 Ravenna Ravine
 Ravenna Woods
 Ravenna-Eckstein Park
 Regrade Park
 Riverview Playfield
 Roanoke Park
 Roanoke Street Mini Park
 Rogers Playground
 Ross Playground
 Rotary Viewpoint
 Roxhill Park
 Sacajawea Playground
 Salmon Bay Park
 Sam Smith Park
 Sandel Playground
 Schmitz Boulevard
 Schmitz Preserve Park
 Seacrest Park
 Seola Park
 Seven Hills Park
 Seward Park
 Sierra Place
 Smith Cove Park
 Solstice Park
 Soundview Playfield
 Soundview Terrace
 South Park Meadow
 South Park Playground
 South Passage Point
 Spring Street Mini Park
 Spruce Street Mini Park
 St. Marks Greenbelt
 Stan Sayres Memorial Park
 Stevens Place
 Stevens Triangle
 Sturgus Park
 Sturtevant Ravine
 Summit Place
 Summit Slope Park
 Sunnyside Ave N Boat Ramp
 Sunset Hill Park
 Sunset Place
 SW Queen Anne Greenbelt
 T.T. Minor Playground
 Tashkent Park
 Taylor Creek Headwaters
 Terry Pettus Park
 Thayer Place
 Thomas C. Wales Park
 Thomas Street Mini Park
 Thorndyke Park
 Thornton Creek Natural Area
 Thyme Patch Park
 Tilikum Place
 Troll’s Knoll Park
 Trolley Hill Park
 Trudy's Triangle
 Twelfth Avenue South Viewpoint
 Union Bay Boglands
 Union Station Square
 University Circle
 University Heights Plaza
 University Lake Shore Place
 University Playground
 Urban Triangle Park
 Ursula Judkins Viewpoint
 Van Asselt Playground
 Victor Steinbrueck Park
 Victory Creek Park
 Victory Heights Playground
 View Ridge Playfield
 Viretta Park
 Virgil Flaim Park
 Volunteer Park
 Volunteer Parkway
 Wallingford Playfield
 Wallingford Steps
 Walt Hundley Playfield
 Ward Springs Park
 Washington Park Arboretum
 Washington Park Playfield
 Washington Street Boat Landing
 Waterfront Park
 Waterway 19
 Watton Site
 Webster Park
 Wedgwood Square
 West Duwamish Greenbelt
 West Ewing Mini Park
 West Montlake Park
 West Queen Anne Playfield
 West Seattle Stadium
 Westcrest Park
 Westlake Greenbelt
 Westlake Park
 Westlake Square
 William Grose Park
 Williams Place
 Wolf Creek Ravine Natural Area
 Woodland Park
 Woodland Park Rose Garden
 Yesler Terrace Park
 York Park
 York Playground

All Port of Seattle parks

 Bridge Gear Park
 Centennial Park (formerly Elliott Bay Park)
 Duwamish River People’s Park and Shoreline Habitat
 Seattle Fishermen's Memorial.
 həʔapus Village Park and Shoreline Habitat (formerly Terminal 107 Park)
 Jack Block Park (formerly Terminal 5 Park)
 Salmon Cove Park and Shoreline Habitat (formerly Turning Basin #3)
 sbəq̓ʷaʔ Park and Shoreline Habitat (formerly Terminal 108/Diagonal Park)
 t̓ałt̓ałucid Park and Shoreline Habitat (formerly 8th Ave. South Park)
 Terminal 115 Public Access
 Terminal 18 Park
 Terminal 91 Bike Trail (part of the Elliott Bay Trail)
 t̓uʔəlaltxʷ Village Park and Shoreline Habitat (formerly Terminal 105 Park)

See also
List of Olmsted parks in Seattle
Shoreline street ends in Seattle

References

External links

Park List, City of Seattle Parks and Recreation.

Seattle

Parks